Matthew Anthony Mazza (September 13, 1923 – June 11, 2003) was an American National Basketball Association forward. He played with the Sheboygan Red Skins during the 1949–50 NBA season.

References

1923 births
2003 deaths
American men's basketball players
Basketball players from New York (state)
Forwards (basketball)
Michigan State Spartans men's basketball players
Sheboygan Red Skins players
Sportspeople from Niagara Falls, New York
Undrafted National Basketball Association players